Moabi Airport  is an airport serving the town of Moabi in the Nyanga Province of Gabon.

See also

 List of airports in Gabon
 Transport in Gabon

References

External links
Google Maps - Moabi
Moabi Airport
OpenStreetMap - Moabi
OurAirports - Moabi

Airports in Gabon